Federal Government College Odogbolu is a federal owned secondary school located in Odogbolu town in Ogun State. The school was founded in January 1973 as one of the unity schools by the federal government. It has facilities for both day and boarding students. The principal is Mr. Akinpelu Amos. The school has Unique features one of which the Sporting Houses are differentiated  by colours and the houses are named after unique water bodies in Nigeria Such as Lake Chad which is knowns as Chad House, Cross River which is known as Cross House, Niger River which stands for Niger House and Osun River which is known as Osun House.

Former students 
 Fisayo Ajisola, television and film actress, model and singer
 Rotimi Babatunde, writer and playwright
 Olurotimi Badero, physician
 Emamode Edosio, film maker and film director
 Ufuoma McDermott, film-maker, actor and former model
 Blessing Nwagba, politician
Bayo Onanuga, Director-General, News Agency of Nigeria
 Adewale Tinubu, businessperson
 Patrick Chuka, Artist and Entrepreneur
Abubakar Liman, military officer and commandant AFCSC, jaji.

References

External links 
 , the school's official website

1973 establishments in Nigeria
Boarding schools in Nigeria
Secondary schools in Ogun State
Educational institutions established in 1973
Government schools in Nigeria